The United Nations Interim Security Force for Abyei (UNISFA) is a United Nations peacekeeping force in Abyei, which is contested between the Republic of Sudan and the Republic of South Sudan. UNISFA was approved on 27 June 2011 by the United Nations Security Council in United Nations Security Council Resolution 1990 after a flareup in the South Kordofan conflict earlier in June 2011. The Ethiopian Army is the largest contributor of personnel, and as of 2018, the only contributor of individual troops.

Command
In the operation's initial years, the position of Head of Mission and Force Commander were jointly held by the same person. Since 2014, both positions are held by a different person.

Since 28 January 2015, the Head of Mission has been Haile Tilahun Gebremariam. Since April 2018, the Force Commander has been Major General Gebre Adhana Woldezgu.

Contributing countries
As of 31 May 2018, the total number of personnel in the mission is 4,571, all but a little over 100 of whom are Ethiopian.

References

External links
United Nations Interim Security Force for Abyei

Politics of South Sudan
Political organisations based in South Sudan
Politics of Sudan
History of Sudan
United Nations operations in Sudan
United Nations Security Council mandates
Military operations involving India
2011 in South Sudan
2011 in Sudan
Military of Ethiopia
South Sudan and the United Nations